Larisa Bergen (born 22 September 1949) is a former volleyball player for the USSR.  She is Jewish, and was born in Akmolinsk, Kazakh SSR.  Bergen played for ADK Alma-Ata and Dynamo Moscow.  She won a silver medal in volleyball at the 1976 Olympics, in Montreal, Canada.

See also
 List of select Jewish volleyball players

References

External links
 

Living people
Kazakhstani women's volleyball players
Soviet women's volleyball players
Olympic volleyball players of the Soviet Union
Volleyball players at the 1976 Summer Olympics
Olympic silver medalists for the Soviet Union
Olympic medalists in volleyball
Jewish women's volleyball players
Jewish Kazakhstani sportspeople
Soviet Jews
1949 births
Sportspeople from Astana
Medalists at the 1976 Summer Olympics